The Israeli Armored Corps (Heil HaShiryon) is a corps of the Israel Defense Forces that, since 1998, has been subordinate to GOC Army Headquarters. The Armored Corps is the principal maneuvering corps, and primarily bases its strength on Main Battle Tanks.

The Armored Corps is the decisive corps in GOC Army Headquarters, and bases its power on a combination of mobility, armor, and firepower. During wars, its primary role on the one hand, to lead the first line of the attacking forces and to clear the area of the enemy. Secondarily, it blocks the armor forces of the enemy and seeks to destroy its tanks and armor. During peacetime, it reinforces the Infantry Corps while it performs security tasks, with the tanks serving as mobile bunkers.

Active units
The following list contains all currently active armor brigades:

 7th "Saar me-Golan/Storm from Golan" Armor Brigade
 188th "Barak/Lightning" Armor Brigade
 401st "I'kvot Ha-Barzel/Iron Trails" Armor Brigade
 460th "Bnei Or/Sons of Light" (Training) Armor Brigade

Unit histories 
 36th "Ga'ash" Armor Division The division is stationed on the Golan Heights under Northern Command. It includes the 7th and 188th Armor Brigades:
 7th "Saar me-Golan" Armor Brigade It was the first IDF armored brigade and has participated in all of Israel's wars. The brigade's fighting during the Suez War resulted in a breakthrough in how the army approached the character of armored warfare. , the brigade is transitioning from Merkava 2 tanks to Merkava 4 tanks.
 188th "Barak" Armor Brigade Beginning with the Six-Day War, the brigade participated in all of Israel's wars. During the Yom Kippur War, the brigade was the first line of defense in the first days of the war in the Southern Golan, and saw almost all of its officers killed in action. It was the last armored brigade to use the Centurion tank, converting to Merkava 3 tanks in 1992, later completing their coversion to Merkava Mark 4M-400 in July 2019.
 162nd "Utzvat HaPlada" Armor Division This division is subordinated to Southern Command. It includes the 401st Armor Brigade:
 401st "I'kvot Ha-Barzel" Armor Brigade This brigade was created in 1968 in order to control the Suez Canal line. During the Yom Kippur War, it faced the first line of attack in the canal and suffered heavy losses. During the 1982 Lebanon War, it fought in the Southern force—one of its battalions participated in the Sultan Yaakov battle. During 2004–05, the brigade's Magach tanks were replaced by Merkava 4 tanks.
 460th "Bnei Or" Armor Brigade This brigade is the training brigade of the Armored Corps. It maintains two bases: the Shizafon training base—the school for the corps' commanders, where the officers and tank commanders are instructed, as well as basic training for all brigades, and advanced training for the 401st and 7th brigades — and Camp Magen-Sayarim, which is shared with the Combat Intelligence Collection Corps and Border Defense Corp as grounds for the advanced training for soldiers of the 188th Brigade.
As an added footnote - Sayarim used to be the Armored Corp base for basic training for Armored Corpsmen, and advanced training was received in specific designated companies in active battalions under the operational brigades. Around 2004, advanced training was moved to Shizafon, whereafter basic training was also gradually moved to Shizafon. After the creation (and later disbanding of in 2021) of the Mesaya'at fire support and reconnaissance training battalion (and operational companies in active battalions), the advanced training of the 188th brigade was moved to Sayarim, where it stays (per 2022).
Plans are discussed for the re-integration of the 188th advanced training to Shizafon, and furthermore, of all advanced training returning to active battalions.

Reserve units 

The following list contains all reserve armor brigades:

 4th "Kiryati" (Reserve) Armor Brigade
 8th (Reserve) Armor Brigade
 10th "Harel" (Reserve) Armor Brigade
 14th "Machatz/Bison" (Reserve) Armor Brigade
 37th "Ram" (Reserve) Armor Brigade
 205th "Iron Fist" (Reserve) Armor Brigade
 263rd "Merkavot ha-Esh/Chariots of Fire" (Reserve) Armor Brigade
 679th "Yiftah" (Reserve) Armor Brigade
 847th "Chariots of Steel" (Reserve) Armor Brigade

Unit histories 
 252nd "Sinai" (Reserve) Armor Division This division is stationed in the South of Israel and under Southern Command. It includes the 10th and 14th Armor Brigades:
 10th "Harel" (Reserve) Armor Brigade The brigade was established as a division of the Palmach on 16 April 1948, immediately after Operation Nachshon. Yitzhak Rabin was appointed as its first commander. During the Suez Crisis (Kadesh Operation) in 1956, the brigade fought as an infantry brigade commanded by Shmuel Gudar. In 1959, the brigade was made into a reserve unit of the Armored Corps. In the Six-Day War, the brigade fought in the battles for Jerusalem under the command of Uri Ben Ari. Today, the brigade is part of Uzvat Amud ha-Esh ("Pillar of Fire").
 14th "Machatz" (Reserve) Armor Brigade The brigade was active during the War of Attrition when it split to provide the basis for the 401st Armoured Brigade. During the Yom Kippur War, it was initially an armored reserve supporting the infantry brigades holding the Bar-Lev Line. It suffered terrible casualties during the war but was rebuilt afterwards.
 319th "Ha-Mapatz" (Reserve) Armor Division This division is stationed in the North of Israel and under Northern Command. It includes the 4th and 205th Armor Brigades:
 4th "Kiryati" (Reserve) Armor Brigade
 205th "Iron Fist" (Reserve) Armor Brigade
 340th "Idan" (Reserve) Armor Division This division is stationed in Central Israel and under Central Command. It includes the 847th Armor Brigade:
 847th "Merkavot HaPlada/Chariots of Steel" (Reserve) Armor Brigade Recently, the brigade took part in the 2006 Lebanon War, most notably in the Battle of Bint Jbeil and battle of Yaroun; during the war, the brigade killed approximately 60 Hezbollah fighters.

Selection and training
All recruits must have a minimum Medical Profile of 72. Cadets first undergo eight weeks of basic training, which is classed as Rifleman 04 level in the Tironut system. They train in light weapons,  field training, first aid, and physical fitness.

Following the end of basic training, the cadets train for six weeks in one of three specialties: gunner,  loader, and driver.  They engage in theoretical and practical exercises during this period. After completing this training,  the cadets are granted their beret and move on to complete 10 weeks of exercises during which they practice engaging in combat and functioning as tank crews.

At the end of the course,  some soldiers are selected to attend the tank commander's course. The tank commander's course lasts about three and a half months,  during which cadets train in the two other specialties that they did not train in earlier, and in the principles of command,  control,  navigation,  and assessment of situations. Following the end of the course,  exceptional soldiers are offered the opportunity to attend the officer's course,  which lasts 7 months, during which they learn to command an armored platoon in close cooperation with other field units.

After Armored Corps soldiers complete their active service,  they are moved into reserve units. Active reservists in the Armor Corps attend training exercises once a year.

Disbanded units
 211th Brigade
Also known as the Yishai (acronym for "Guardians of Jerusalem Unit"), during the Lebanon War of 1982, it was famously led by Colonel Eli Geva, who, during the Siege of Beirut, refused to lead his soldiers into the city for moral reasons. He was dismissed from the army, and the brigade itself was dissolved in the early 1990s.
 500th Brigade
Also known as the Kfir ("Young Lion") Formation, this was a regular armor brigade that operated from 1972 until 2003. During the Yom Kippur War, it participated in the Battle of Suez. During the Lebanon War of 1982, it fought in the framework of the Eastern force and participated in the Eyn Zhalata battle. In 2003, due to changes in the IDF structure, and the lessening of the threat from the eastern front (due to the USA war in Iraq), the brigade was dissolved.

See also
 Yad La-Shiryon

References

Nationstate armoured warfare branches
Corps of Israel
Military units and formations established in 1948